This is the qualifications of the 2018 Rugby World Cup Sevens – Women's tournament aimed at selecting women's Rugby sevens national teams that appeared in the finals in San Francisco. A total of 52 nations took part in the qualifying process.

General 
The tournament is organized by World Rugby to be held on 20–22 July 2018, with sixteen teams in attendance. Automatic qualification is extended the semi-finalists of the previous World Cup (of which host United States is one). Four other bids were determined by placement in the 2016-17 World Rugby Women's Sevens Series, with the remainder decided in each of the six regions' respective tournaments.

Qualified teams

Qualifying

Africa

The tournament was held 16–17 September 2017 in Monastir, Tunisia, with South Africa beating Kenya 17–12 to obtain the one allotted Africa slot for the World Cup.

Americas North

The qualifying Tournament, which is also Rugby Americas North Women's Sevens, took place at the Campo Marte in Mexico City, 25–26 November 2017. With Mexico having the best record, it will make its first World Cup appearance.

South America

The 2017 Torneo Valentín Martínez served as the South American qualifier, with the winner heading to the World Cup. It was held at Carrasco Polo Club in Montevideo, Uruguay on November 10-11.

The format was a round robin tournament. All matches in Uruguay Standard Time (UTC−03:00)

Asia

From 23–24 September and 14–15 October, eight teams competed in Incheon and Colombo for two world cup slots.

Europe

Twelve teams competed at the Rugby Europe Women's Sevens Grand Prix at 17–18 June 2017 in Malemort, France, then 8–9 July in Kazan, Russia.

Oceania

Eight teams competed in Suva, Fiji on 10-11 November 2017, with Australia, Fiji and New Zealand already qualified. Papua New Guinea, as the highest-ranked team not yet qualified, was eligible.

References

External links 
 Official website

2018
Qualifying
World Cup Qualifier Sevens
2017 in women's rugby union